Sreten Mirković (Serbian Cyrillic: Сретен Мирковић; 15 February 1958 – 28 September 2016) was a Serbian boxer. He had been referred to as a "legend of Serbian boxing."

Career
In 1979, as a member of the Mladi Radnik Sports Society from Požarevac, Mirković won the silver medal at the European Amateur Boxing Championships.

Coaching
Mirković was a coach in the Kostolac Boxing Club and was a coach of the Mladi Radnik Boxing Club in Požarevac.

Death
Mirković died on 28 September 2016 after a lengthy battle with lung cancer. He is interred in the Požarevac Old Cemetery.

References

1958 births
2016 deaths
Sportspeople from Pristina
Sportspeople from Požarevac
Serbian Romani people
Romani sportspeople
Serbian male boxers
Welterweight boxers
Yugoslav male boxers
Deaths from lung cancer
Deaths from cancer in Serbia
Burials in Požarevac
Mediterranean Games bronze medalists for Yugoslavia
Mediterranean Games medalists in boxing
Competitors at the 1983 Mediterranean Games